The 1938–39 season was Galatasaray SK's 35th in existence and the club's 27th consecutive season in the Istanbul Football League.

Squad statistics

Competitions

Istanbul Football Super League

Classification

Matches 
Kick-off listed in local time (EEST)

Milli Küme Şampiyonası

Classification

Matches
Kick-off listed in local time (EEST)

Friendly Matches

Stadium Cup
Galatasaray SK won the cup on goal difference over Fenerbahçe SK.

Tan Cup
Galatasaray SK won 2 cups beating Fenerbahçe SK twice.

References
 Tuncay, Bülent (2002). Galatasaray Tarihi. Yapı Kredi Yayınları 
 Futbol vol.2, Galatasaray. Tercüman Spor Ansiklopedisi.(1981) (page 586, 595). Tercüman Gazetecilik ve Matbaacılık AŞ.
 Tekil, Süleyman. Dünden bugüne Galatasaray(1983). Page(120–123, 183). Arset Matbaacılık Kol.Şti.
 Atabeyoğlu, Cem. 1453–1991 Türk Spor Tarihi Ansiklopedisi. page(149–151).(1991) An Grafik Basın Sanayi ve Ticaret AŞ
 1938 Milli Küme Maçları. Türk Futbol Tarihi vol.1. page(80–81). (June 1992) Türkiye Futbol Federasyonu Yayınları.
 Yeni Sabah Newspaper Archives, April–May 1939

External links
 Galatasaray Sports Club Official Website 
 Turkish Football Federation – Galatasaray A.Ş. 
 uefa.com – Galatasaray AŞ

Galatasaray S.K. (football) seasons
Turkish football clubs 1938–39 season
1930s in Istanbul